Lottie Blackford (3 February 1881 – 30 December 1973) was an English actress of the silent era.

Marylebone, London and died in Los Angeles, California, aged 92.

She was also a theatre actress, sometimes of the burlesque genre.

Partial filmography
 Rock of Ages (1918)
 The Homemaker (1919)
 The Knave of Hearts (1919)
 Tilly of Bloomsbury (1921)
 The School for Scandal (1923)
 The Dawn of Truth (1920)
 The Narrow Valley (1921)

References

External links

1881 births
1973 deaths
English film actresses
English silent film actresses
Actresses from London
20th-century English actresses
British expatriates in the United States